Curtis Newton (born July 24, 1994) is a professional Canadian football linebacker for the Hamilton Tiger-Cats of the Canadian Football League. He was a member of the 105th Grey Cup champion Toronto Argonauts. He played CIS football for the Guelph Gryphons.

University career
Newton played Canadian Interuniversity Sport football for the Guelph Gryphons from 2012 to 2015. He was named an OUA All-Star and second-team CIS All-Canadian in 2014. In his fourth year in 2015, he was named a second-team OUA All-Star.

Professional career
Newton was drafted in the fifth round, 40th overall, in the 2016 CFL Draft by the Toronto Argonauts and signed with the team on May 19, 2016. He played in his first professional game on June 30, 2016 and recorded his first special teams tackle in the same game. He finished the 2016 season with four special teams tackles in 16 games played. The following season, he played in the Argonauts' first two games, but was released on July 11, 2017. He signed with the Hamilton Tiger-Cats on July 25, 2017 and played in five games before again being released on October 4, 2017. He was then signed back to the Argos on October 5, 2017 and played in one game before finishing the season on Toronto's practice roster. Newton won his first Grey Cup championship as a member of the 105th Grey Cup champion Toronto Argonauts.

After being released from his practice roster agreement, Newton signed as a free agent with the Hamilton Tiger-Cats on February 6, 2018. He played in all 18 regular season games in 2018, recording a career high 11 special teams tackles and two defensive tackles. He also recorded his first blocked punt on August 3, 2018 which was returned for a touchdown by teammate Sean Thomas Erlington. Newton also played in his first post-season games that year, recording three special teams tackles in two games. On January 15, 2020, The Tiger-Cats announced they had signed Newton to a contract extension. He signed another contract extension with the Tiger-Cats on December 29, 2020.

References

External links
Hamilton Tiger-Cats bio

1994 births
Living people
Canadian football linebackers
Hamilton Tiger-Cats players
Toronto Argonauts players
Players of Canadian football from Ontario
Sportspeople from London, Ontario
University of Guelph alumni
Guelph Gryphons football players